Božanovići  is a village in the municipality of Kalinovik, Republika Srpska, Bosnia and Herzegovina. It is located northwest of the town of Kalinovik. In 1991 it had a population of 66 people.

History
During World War II, Božanovići was part of the Independent State of Croatia.

Geography
Božanovići is located northwest of the town of Kalinovik.

Demographics
In 1991 Božanovići had a population of 66 people.

Notable people
Ratko Mladić, the Bosnian Serb general and military war criminal sentenced by international tribunal in The Hague for genocide in Bosnia was born in Božanovići

References

Villages in Republika Srpska
Populated places in Kalinovik